Constance Sutton Titus (August 14, 1873 – August 24, 1967) was an American rower who competed in the 1904 Summer Olympics. In 1904 he won the bronze medal in the single sculls.

References

External links
 profile

1873 births
1967 deaths
Rowers at the 1904 Summer Olympics
Olympic bronze medalists for the United States in rowing
American male rowers
Medalists at the 1904 Summer Olympics